Irina-Camelia Begu and Elena Bogdan were the defending champions, but they did not partner up together.
Begu partnered up with Alizé Cornet and successfully defended her title defeating Elena Bogdan and Raluca Olaru in the final 6–2, 6–0.

Seeds

Draw

Draw

References
 Main Draw

BCR Open Romania Ladies - Doubles
BCR Open Romania Ladies